Charles Coulomb may refer to:
 Charles-Augustin de Coulomb (1736–1806), French physicist known for his work in electromagnetics
 Charles A. Coulombe, American author